Gehan Dassanayake was a Sri Lankan cricketer who played for Sinhalese Sports Club.

Dassanayake made a single first-class appearance for the side, during the 1988–89 season, against Burgher Recreation Club. He did not bat in the match, but bowled 7 overs, taking figures of 2–11.

External links
Gehan Dassanayake at Cricket Archive 

Sri Lankan cricketers
Sinhalese Sports Club cricketers
Living people
Place of birth missing (living people)
Year of birth missing (living people)
Sinhalese sportspeople